Lincoln Palmer Bloomfield (1920-2013) an American academic and expert on foreign affairs who served as a professor of political science at Massachusetts Institute of Technology.

Biography
Lincoln P. Bloomfield is the father of Lincoln P. Bloomfield Jr., a United States Defense Department and State Department official.

Bloomfield served five United States Secretaries of State, held an administrative State Department position in the early years of the United Nations, and was director of global issues on the National Security Council during the Carter administration.

Bloomfield was a member of the Council on Foreign Relations.

Bloomfield's work at the Massachusetts Institute of Technology led to the development of the CASCON conflict analysis system.

Works

Books
 International Military Forces: The Question of Peacekeeping in an Armed and Disarming World. Boston: Little, Brown, 1964.
 Khrushchev and the Arms Race: Soviet Interests in Arms Control and Disarmament, 1954-1964. Cambridge: MIT Press, 1966.
 The United Nations and U.S. Foreign Policy: A New Look at the National Interest. Boston: Little, Brown, 1967.
 Controlling Small Wars: A Strategy for the 1970's. New York: Knopf, 1969.
 The Foreign Policy Process: A Modern Primer. Englewood Cliffs, NJ: Prentice-Hall, 1982. 
 Prospects for Peacemaking: A Citizen's Guide to Safer Nuclear Strategy. Cambridge: MIT Press, 1987.

Articles and essays
 "The U.N. and National Security." Foreign Affairs, Vol. 36, No. 4, July 1958, pp. 597-610. 
 "Conflict Resolution: U.N. Nonfighting Forces." Naval War College Review, Vol. 20, No. 9, April 1968. 
 "Nuclear Spread and World Order." Foreign Affairs, Vol. 53, No. 4, July 1975, pp. 743-755. 
 "The Arctic: Last Unmanaged Frontier." Foreign Affairs, Vol. 60, No. 1, Fall 1981, pp. 87-105.

Reports
 A World Effectively Controlled by the United Nations: A Preliminary Survey of One Form of a Stable Military Environment. Alexandria, VA: Institute for Defense Analyses, 1962.
  The Foreign Policy Process: Making Theory Relevant (International Studies Series). Beverly Hills, CA: SAGE Publications, 1974.

References

External links
A Guide to the Papers of Lincoln P. Bloomfield at MIT.

1920 births
2013 deaths
American political scientists
MIT School of Humanities, Arts, and Social Sciences faculty